Wrongful execution is a miscarriage of justice occurring when an innocent person is put to death by capital punishment. Cases of wrongful execution are cited as an argument by opponents of capital punishment, while proponents say that the argument of innocence concerns the credibility of the justice system as a whole and does not solely undermine the use of the death penalty.

A variety of individuals are claimed to have been innocent victims of the death penalty. Newly available DNA evidence has allowed the exoneration and release of more than 20 death-row inmates since 1992 in the United States, but DNA evidence is available in only a fraction of capital cases. At least 190 people who were sentenced to death in the United States have been exonerated and released since 1973, with official misconduct and perjury/false accusation the leading causes of their wrongful convictions. The Death Penalty Information Center (U.S.) has published a partial listing of wrongful executions that, as of the end of 2020, identified 20 death-row prisoners who were "executed but possibly innocent".

Judicial murder is a type of wrongful execution.

Specific examples

Australia
Colin Campbell Ross was hanged in Melbourne in 1922 for the murder of 12-year-old Alma Tirtschke the previous year in what became known as the Gun Alley Murder. The case was re-examined in the 1990s using modern techniques and Ross was eventually pardoned in 2008, by which time capital punishment in Australia had been abolished in all jurisdictions.

Ronald Ryan was the last person executed in Australia. His execution took place on 3 February 1967. He and a fellow inmate, Peter John Walker, attempted to escape from Pentridge Prison on 19 December 1965, when prison guard George Hodgson was shot and killed. Multiple witnesses swore that they saw Ryan fire the shot that killed Hodgson, so he was found guilty. The true identity of the shooter is in contention as two other guards admitted to firing several shots, and in 2007, Peter John Walker said that it would have been impossible for Ryan to have shot the guard as his rifle had jammed.

People's Republic of China
Wei Qing'an (born 1961) was a Chinese citizen who was executed for the rape of Kun Liu, a woman who had disappeared. The execution was carried out on 3 May 1984 by the Intermediate People's Court. In the next month, Tian Yuxiu was arrested and admitted that he had committed the rape. Three years later, Wei was officially declared innocent.

Teng Xingshan was a Chinese citizen who was executed for supposedly having raped, robbed and murdered Shi Xiaorong (石小荣), a woman who had disappeared. An old man found a dismembered body, and incompetent police forensics claimed to have matched the body to the photo of the missing Shi Xiaorong. The execution was carried out on 28 January 1989 by the Huaihua Intermediate People's Court. In 1993, the previously missing woman returned to the village, saying she had been kidnapped and taken to Shandong. The absolute innocence of the wrongfully executed Teng was not admitted until 2005.

Nie Shubin (born 1974) was a Chinese citizen who was executed for the rape and murder of Kang Juhua, a woman in her thirties. The execution was carried out on 27 April 1995 by the Shijiazhuang Intermediate People's Court. In 2005, ten years after the execution, Wang Shujin admitted to the police that he had committed the murder.

On 5 December 2006, ten years after the execution, Zhao Zhihong wrote the Petition of my Death Penalty admitting he had committed the crime. Huugjilt was posthumously exonerated and Zhao Zhihong was sentenced to death in 2015.

Ireland
Sir Edward Crosbie, 5th Baronet was wrongfully executed in Carlow in 1798. Accused of being a United Irishman, his innocence was later proved.

Harry Gleeson was executed in Ireland in April 1941 for the murder of Moll McCarthy in County Tipperary in November 1940. The Gardaí withheld crucial evidence and fabricated other evidence against Gleeson. In 2015, he was posthumously pardoned.

Taiwan
On 28 January 2011, over 13 years after the execution, Hsu Jung-chou, who had a history of sexual abuse, admitted to the prosecutor that he had been responsible for the crime. In September 2011 Chiang was posthumously acquitted by a military court who found Chiang's original confession had been obtained by torture. Ma Ying-jeou, the Republic of China's president, apologised to Chiang's family.

UK
In 1660, in a variety of events known as the Campden Wonder, an Englishman named William Harrison disappeared after going on a walk, near the village of Charingworth, in Gloucestershire. Some of his clothing was found slashed and bloody on the side of a local road. Investigators interrogated Harrison's servant, John Perry, who eventually confessed that his mother and his brother had killed Harrison for money. Perry, his mother, and his brother were hanged. Two years later, Harrison reappeared, telling the incredibly unlikely tale that he had been abducted by three horsemen and sold into slavery in the Ottoman Empire. Though his tale was implausible, he indubitably had not been murdered by the Perry family.
Timothy Evans was tried and executed in March 1950 for the murder of his wife and infant daughter. An official inquiry conducted 16 years later determined that it was Evans' fellow tenant, serial killer John Reginald Halliday Christie, who was responsible for the murders. Christie also admitted to the murder of Evans' wife, following a conviction for murdering five other women and his own wife. Christie, who was himself executed in 1953, may have murdered other women, judging by evidence found in his possession at the time of his arrest, but it was never pursued by the police. Evans was posthumously pardoned in 1966 after the inquiry concluded that Christie had also murdered Evans' daughter. The case was a major factor leading to the abolition of capital punishment in the United Kingdom.
George Kelly was executed in March 1950 for the 1949 murder of the manager of the Cameo Cinema in Liverpool, UK and his assistant during a robbery that went wrong. This case became known as the Cameo Murder. Kelly's conviction was overturned in 2003. Another man, Donald Johnson, had confessed to the crime but the police bungled Johnson's case and had not divulged his confession at Kelly's trial.
Somali-born Mahmood Hussein Mattan was executed in 1952 for the murder of Lily Volpert. In 1998 the Court of Appeal decided that the original case was, in the words of Lord Justice Rose, "demonstrably flawed". The family were awarded £725,000 compensation, to be shared equally among Mattan's wife and three children. The compensation was the first award to a family for a person wrongfully hanged.
Derek Bentley was a learning disabled young man who was executed in 1953. He was convicted of the murder of a police officer during an attempted robbery, despite the fact that it was his accomplice who fired the gun and that Bentley was already under arrest at the time of the shooting. Christopher Craig, the 16-year-old who actually fired the fatal shot, could not be executed as he was under 18. Craig served only ten years in prison before he was released.

United States

University of Michigan law professor Samuel Gross led a team of experts in the law and in statistics that estimated the likely number of unjust convictions. The study, published in Proceedings of the National Academy of Sciences  determined that at least 4% of people on death penalty/death row were and are likely innocent.

Statistics likely understate the actual problem of wrongful convictions because once an execution has occurred there is often insufficient motivation and finance to keep a case open, and it becomes unlikely at that point that the miscarriage of justice will ever be exposed. For example, in the case of Joseph Roger O'Dell III, executed in Virginia in 1997 for a rape and murder, a prosecuting attorney argued in court in 1998 that if posthumous DNA results exonerated O'Dell, "it would be shouted from the rooftops that ... Virginia executed an innocent man." The state prevailed, and the evidence was destroyed.

We-Chank-Wash-ta-don-pee, or Chaska (died December 26, 1862) was a Native American of the Dakota who was executed in a mass hanging near Mankato, Minnesota in the wake of the Dakota War of 1862, despite the fact that President Abraham Lincoln had commuted his death sentence days earlier.

Chipita Rodriguez was hanged in San Patricio County, Texas in 1863 for murdering a horse trader, and 122 years later, the Texas Legislature passed a resolution exonerating her.

Thomas and Meeks Griffin were executed in South Carolina in 1915 for the murder of a man involved in an interracial affair two years previously but were pardoned 94 years after execution. It is thought that they were arrested and charged because they were viewed as wealthy enough to hire competent legal counsel and get an acquittal.

In 1920, two Italian immigrants, Nicola Sacco and Bartolomeo Vanzetti, were controversially accused of robbery and murder in Braintree, Massachusetts. Anti-Italianism, anti-immigrant, and anti-Anarchist bias were suspected as having heavily influenced the verdict. As details of the trial and the men's suspected innocence became known, sporadic protests were held in major cities all around the world calling for their release, especially after Portuguese migrant Celestino Madeiros confessed in 1925 to committing the crime absolving them of participation. However, the Supreme Court refused to upset the verdict, and in spite of worldwide protests, Sacco and Vanzetti were eventually executed in 1927. On August 23, 1977, Massachusetts Governor Michael Dukakis issued a proclamation vindicating Sacco and Vanzetti, stating that they had been treated unjustly and that "any disgrace should be forever removed from their names". Later analyses have also added doubt to their culpability.

In October 1930, a 16-year-old black teenager named Alexander McClay Williams was accused of murdering Vida Robare, a white matron of his reform school, during an attempted sexual assault. Authorities coerced Williams into confessing to the murder, although he later recanted his confession. Overall, authorities subjected Williams to five interrogations without his parents or an attorney present; he signed three different confessions, the last of which was altered to match the crime scene details and the story that Williams had attempted to sexually assault Robare, as Williams's first confession had not matched the crime scene details or the allegations authorities made against him. At his trial, Williams faced an all-white jury while being represented by his county's first black attorney. After a judge formally sentenced him to death, Williams yelled out that he had been promised that authorities would not pursue the death penalty against him if he confessed. His appellate attorneys unsuccessfully tried to stop his execution by arguing that he was a "psychopathic inferior," and he was executed on June 8, 1931, still at the age of 16, becoming the youngest person executed in Pennsylvania. In 2015, a descendant of his attorney, Samuel Lemon, began researching Williams's case and concluded that the most likely culprit behind Robare's murder was her ex-husband, who had supposedly discovered her body; Robare had obtained a divorce against her ex-husband on the grounds of "extreme cruelty" due to his domestic abuse against her. Lemon posited that Williams's wrongful prosecution stemmed largely from his race and the "racially charged" atmosphere present at the time. In 2022, following a posthumous review of Williams's case, his conviction was overturned, and all charges against him were dismissed, effectively exonerating him.

Joe Arridy (1915–1939) was a mentally disabled American man executed for rape and murder and posthumously granted a pardon. Arridy was sentenced to death for the murder and rape of a 15-year-old schoolgirl from Pueblo, Colorado. He confessed to murdering the girl and assaulting her sister. Due to the sensational nature of the crime precautions were taken to keep him from being hanged by vigilante justice. His sentence was executed after multiple stays on January 6, 1939, in the Colorado gas chamber in the state penitentiary in Canon City, Colorado. Arridy was the first Colorado prisoner posthumously pardoned in January 2011 by Colorado Governor Bill Ritter, a former district attorney, after research had shown that Arridy was very likely not in Pueblo when the crime happened and had been coerced into confessing. Among other things, Arridy had an IQ of 46, which was equal to the mental age of a 6-year-old. He did not even understand that he was going to be executed, and played with a toy train that the warden, Roy Best, had given to him as a present. A man named Frank Aguilar had been executed in 1937 in the Colorado gas chamber for the same crime for which Arridy ended up also being executed. Arridy's posthumous pardon in 2011 was the first such pardon in Colorado history. A press release from the governor's office stated, "[A]n overwhelming body of evidence indicates the 23-year-old Arridy was innocent, including false and coerced confessions, the likelihood that Arridy was not in Pueblo at the time of the killing, and an admission of guilt by someone else." The governor also pointed to Arridy's intellectual disabilities. The governor said, “Granting a posthumous pardon is an extraordinary remedy. But the tragic conviction of Mr. Arridy and his subsequent execution on Jan. 6, 1939, merit such relief based on the great likelihood that Mr. Arridy was, in fact, innocent of the crime for which he was executed, and his severe mental disability at the time of his trial and execution."

George Stinney, a 14-year old African-American boy, was electrocuted in South Carolina in 1944 for the murder of Betty June Binnicker, age 11, as well as Mary Emma Thames, age 8.  The arrest occurred on March 23, 1944 in Alcolu, inside of Clarendon County, South Carolina.  Supposedly, the two girls rode their bikes past Stinney's house where they asked him and his sister about a certain type of flower; after this encounter, the girls went missing and were found dead in a ditch the following morning.  After an hour of interrogation by the officers, a deputy stated that Stinney confessed to the murder. He was the youngest person executed in the United States.  More than 70 years later, a judge threw out the conviction, calling it a "great injustice."

Carlos DeLuna was executed in Texas in December 1989 for stabbing a gas station clerk to death. Subsequent investigations cast strong doubt upon DeLuna's guilt for the murder of which he had been convicted.  His execution came about six years after the crime was committed. DeLuna was found blocks away from the crime scene with $149 in his pocket. A wrongful eyewitness testimony and DeLuna's previous criminal record were used against him. Carlos Hernandez, who many believe to be the true killer, was a repeat violent offender who had a history of assaulting women with knives, and was said to have looked very similar to Carlos DeLuna.  Hernandez was reported to have bragged about the killing of Lopez, the gas station clerk.  In 1999, Hernandez was imprisoned for attacking his neighbor with a knife.

Jesse Tafero was convicted of murder and executed via electric chair in May 1990 in the state of Florida for the murders of a Florida Highway Patrol officer and a Canadian constable. The conviction of a co-defendant was overturned in 1992 after a recreation of the crime scene indicated a third person had committed the murders. Not only was Tafero wrongly accused, his electric chair malfunctioned as well – three times.  As a result, Tafero's head caught on fire. After this encounter, a debate was focused around humane methods of execution.  Lethal injections became more common in the states rather than the electric chair.

Johnny Garrett of Texas was executed in February 1992 for allegedly raping and murdering a nun. In March 2004 cold-case DNA testing identified Leoncio Rueda as the rapist and murderer of another elderly victim killed four months earlier. Immediately following the nun's murder, prosecutors and police were certain the two cases were committed by the same assailant. The flawed case is explored in a 2008 documentary entitled The Last Word.

Cameron Todd Willingham of Texas was convicted and executed for the death of his three children who died in a house fire. The prosecution charged that the fire was caused by arson. He has not been posthumously exonerated, but the case has gained widespread attention as a possible case of wrongful execution. A number of arson experts have decried the results of the original investigation as faulty. In June 2009, five years after Willingham's execution, the State of Texas ordered a re-examination of the case. Dr. Craig Beyler found "a finding of arson could not be sustained". Beyler said that key testimony from a fire marshal at Willingham's trial was "hardly consistent with a scientific mind-set and is more characteristic of mystics or psychics". The Texas Forensic Science Commission was scheduled to discuss the report by Beyler at a meeting on October 2, 2009, but two days before the meeting Texas Governor Rick Perry replaced the chair of the commission and two other members. The new chair canceled the meeting, sparking accusations that Perry was interfering with the investigation and using it for his own political advantage. In 2010, a four-person panel of the Texas Forensic Science Commission acknowledged that state and local arson investigators used "flawed science" in determining the blaze had been deliberately set.

In 2015, the Justice Department and the FBI formally acknowledged that nearly every examiner in an FBI forensic squad overstated forensic hair matches for two decades before the year 2000. Of the 28 forensic examiners testifying to hair matches in a total of 268 trials reviewed, 26 overstated the evidence of forensic hair matches and 95% of the overstatements favored the prosecution. Defendants were sentenced to death in 32 of those 268 cases.

The executions of Nathaniel Woods, Dustin Higgs, and Troy Davis have been cited by some as possible cases of wrongful executions.

In 2003, Juan Catalan was arrested and indicted for the shooting death of 16-year-old Martha Puebla, and was facing capital punishment for the charges. The charges against Catalan were dropped after pre-production footage of an episode of Curb Your Enthusiasm was obtained by his lawyer, showing him in the background of a scene. This corroborated his claim that he was attending a Los Angeles Dodgers baseball game at the time of the murder.

Russia 
Aleksandr Kravchenko was executed in 1983 for the 1978 murder of nine year old Yelena Zakotnova in Shakhty, a coal mining town near Rostov-on-Don. Kravchenko as a teenager, had served a prison sentence for the rape and murder of a teenage girl but witnesses said he was not at the scene of Zakotnova's murder at the time.  Under police pressure the witnesses altered their statements and Kravchenko was executed.  Later it was found that the girl had been murdered by Andrei Chikatilo, a serial killer nicknamed "the Red Ripper" and "the Butcher of Rostov", who was executed in 1994.

Exonerations and pardons

Kirk Bloodsworth was the first American to be freed from death row as a result of exoneration by DNA evidence. Bloodsworth was a Marine before he became a waterman on the Eastern Shore of Maryland. At the age of 22, he was wrongly convicted of the murder of a nine-year-old girl; she had been sexually assaulted, strangled, and beaten with a rock. An anonymous call to the police claiming that the witness had seen Bloodsworth with the girl that day, and he matched up with the description from the police sketch. Five witnesses claiming that they saw Bloodsworth with the victim, as well as a statement in his testimony where he claimed that he had "done something terrible that day" that would affect his relationship with his wife, did not help his case. No physical evidence connected Bloodsworth to the crime, but he was still convicted of rape and murder which led to him receiving a death sentence. In 1992, DNA from the crime scene was tested against Bloodsworth's and found that he could not have been the killer. After serving nine years in prison, he was released in June 1993.

Ray Krone is the 100th American to have been sentenced to death and then later exonerated. Krone was convicted of the murder of Kim Ancona, thirty-six year old victim in Phoenix, Arizona. Ancona had been found nude, fatally stabbed. The physical evidence that the police had to rely on was bite marks on Ancona's breasts and neck. After Ancona had told a friend that Krone, a regular customer, was going to help her close the bar the previous night, the police brought him in to make a Styrofoam impression of his teeth. After comparing the teeth marks, Krone was arrested for the murder, kidnapping, and sexual assault of Ancona on December 31, 1991. At the trial in 1992, Krone pled innocence, but the teeth mark comparison led the jury to find him guilty and he was sentenced to death as well as a consecutive twenty-one year term of imprisonment. Krone's family also believed that he was innocent, which led them to spend over $300,000 in order to fight for his freedom.

The Death Penalty Information Center has identified at least 190 former death-row prisoners in the United States who have been exonerated since 1973. DPIC reported in February 2021 that exonerated death-row prisoners had been wrongly convicted and sentenced to death in 29 different states and in 118 different counties. The leading causes of these wrongful capital convictions were official misconduct by police, prosecutors, or other government officials and perjury or false accusation. Underscoring the often intentional nature of wrongful capital convictions, more than half of all exonerations involved both official misconduct and perjury or false accusation, and at least one or the other was present in nearly 83% of the cases. 

In the UK, reviews prompted by the Criminal Cases Review Commission have resulted in one pardon and three exonerations for people that were executed between 1950 and 1953 (when the execution rate in England and Wales averaged 17 per year), with compensation being paid. Timothy Evans was granted a posthumous free pardon in 1966. Mahmood Hussein Mattan was convicted in 1952 and was the last person to be hanged in Cardiff, Wales, but had his conviction quashed in 1998. George Kelly was hanged at Liverpool in 1950, but had his conviction quashed by the Court of Appeal in June 2003. Derek Bentley had his conviction quashed in 1998 with the appeal trial judge, Lord Bingham, noting that the original trial judge, Lord Goddard, had denied the defendant "the fair trial which is the birthright of every British citizen."

Colin Campbell Ross (1892–1922) was an Australian wine-bar owner executed for the murder of a child which became known as The Gun Alley Murder, despite there being evidence that he was innocent. Following his execution, efforts were made to clear his name, and in the 1990s old evidence was re-examined with modern forensic techniques which supported the view that Ross was innocent. In 2006 an appeal for mercy was made to Victoria's Chief Justice and on 27 May 2008 the Victorian government pardoned Ross in what is believed to be an Australian legal first.

U.S. mental health controversy
There has been much debate about the justification of imposing capital punishment on individuals who have been diagnosed with mental disabilities. Some have argued that the execution of people with serious mental illness or intellectual disability constitutes cruel and unusual punishment in violation of the Eighth Amendment to the United States Constitution. While the U.S. Supreme Court has interpreted cruel and unusual punishment to include those punishments that fail to take into account the defendant's degree of criminal culpability, it has never held that it is unconstitutional to apply the death penalty to those with serious mental illness and did not determine that executing intellectually disabled individuals constitutes cruel and unusual punishment until 2002.

In 1986, in Ford v. Wainwright, the US Supreme Court ruled that it is unconstitutional to execute a person who does not understand the reason for or the reality of his or her punishment. The issue of whether it is constitutional to execute those with severe mental illness has repeatedly arisen in the state of Texas, where at least 25 individuals with documented diagnoses of paranoid schizophrenia, bipolar disorder, and other severe persistent mental illnesses have been put to death. However, Ford applies only to the mental competency of the prisoner at the time of execution, not to the constitutionality of his or her death sentence. The US Court of Appeals for the Fifth Circuit, the federal appeals court that handles cases from Texas, has narrowly construed Ford and has never found a death-row prisoner to be incompetent to be executed. In Panetti v. Quarterman, the Fifth Circuit held that a man with a long history of paranoid schizophrenia was competent to be executed because, despite his delusions, he was aware that the state intended to execute him for committing a particular murder. The US Supreme Court reversed, finding that the Fifth Circuit's incompetency standard was "too restrictive." The appropriate Eighth Amendment inquiry, the Court said, was whether Panetti had a "rational understanding" of the reason for his execution, not whether he was aware of the State’s rationale for executing him. 

In 2019, in the case of Alabama death-row prisoner Vernon Madison, the Court again addressed the proper standard for determining competency to be executed. Madison had cognitive dementia resulting from a series of strokes that, his lawyers said, left him without a rational understanding of why Alabama intended to execute him. The Alabama courts had declared him competent to be executed, ruling that Panetti applied only to cases in which prisoners understanding of the reasons for their pending execution were distorted by delusional mental illness. In Madison v. Alabama, the US Supreme Court disagreed, holding that the critical inquiry was whether the prisoner had a rational understanding of the reasons for the execution, not the type of disorder that caused him or her to lack a rational understanding.
 
A distinct, but related, issue in the U.S. death penalty is the constitutionality of applying capital punishment to those with intellectual disability. Intellectual disability is a developmental disorder characterized by significantly subaverage intellectual functioning, substantially impaired daily functioning, and onset during the developmental period. The US Supreme Court first addressed this issue in 1989 in the case of Penry v. Lynaugh, in which Texas death-row prisoner Johnny Paul Penry argued that the application of the death penalty to individuals with mental retardation, as the disorder was then known, constituted cruel and unusual punishment in violation of the Eighth Amendment. Penry presented evidence that his that his IQ ranged from 50 to 63 — far below the 70-75 IQ level that is typically considered evidence of intellectual disability — and that he possessed the mental abilities of a six-and-a-half-year-old. The Texas state and federal courts denied Penry's challenge and, in a five-to-four decision, the US Supreme Court ruled that the Eighth Amendment did not categorically prohibit the execution of individuals with mental retardation. Following the ruling, sixteen states as well as the federal government passed legislation that banned the execution of offenders with mental retardation.

The Supreme Court revisited Penry in 2002 in the case of Atkins v. Virginia. By a vote of 6-3, the Court held that the Eighth Amendment prohibition against cruel and unusual punishment applied to those with intellectual disability. The Court referred to the clinical definitions of the disorder in use by the medical community but ultimately left to the states the determination of who qualified as intellectually disabled.

In 2014, the Supreme Court ruled in Hall v. Florida that states cannot apply an IQ cut-off score of 70 to arbitrarily limit which individuals qualify as intellectually disabled. Then, in 2017 in Moore v. Texas, the Court struck down Texas's use of a series of clinically inappropriate lay stereotypes that denied intellectually disabled defendants Eighth Amendment protection.

See also

 Capital punishment debate
 Cold case (criminology)
 Charles Hudspeth (convict)
 Extrajudicial punishment
 List of exonerated death row inmates
 List of United States death row inmates
 List of wrongful convictions in the United States
 Miscarriage of justice
 Cameron Todd Willingham

References

 August Ludwig von Schlözer: Abermaliger JustizMord in der Schweiz In: Stats-Anzeigen. Band 2. Göttingen, 1782. S. 273–277. 
 Julius Mühlfeld. Justizmorde. Nach amtlichen Quellen bearbeitete Auswahl 2. Auflage, Berlin (1880) 
 Bernt Ture von zur Mühlen. Napoleons Justizmord am deutschen Buchhändler Johann Philipp Palm. Frankfurt am Main: Braman Verlag (2003)

External links
 Death Penalty Information Center – anti-death penalty organisation
 Justice Denied magazine includes stories of supposedly innocent people who have been executed.
 Database of convicted people said to be innocent includes 150 allegedly wrongfully executed.
 Letter by Voltaire to Frederick II, April 1777 

Capital punishment